Patrick R. "Adawee" Dubar is an American singer, primarily with hardcore bands such as Unity and Uniform Choice, initially in the straight edge subgenre. Together with Pat Longrie (Uniform Choice), they ran the hardcore label Wishingwell Records.

He later went on to bands like Mind Funk, Corporate Avenger and Sitting Bull.

Dubar is a graduate of Pepperdine University.

He is the older brother of Courtney Dubar, founder of Affliction Clothing.

Discography

with Unity 
You Are One... (1985)
Blood Days (1989)

with Uniform Choice 
Uniform Choice (1984)
reissued in 1990
Screaming for Change (1986)
Region of Ice (1988)
Staring into the Sun (1988)

with Mind Funk 
Mind Funk (1991)
Dropped (1993)
People Who Fell from the Sky (1995)

with Corporate Avenger 
The New Testament (2000)
Freedom Is A State Of Mind (2001)
Born Again (2005)

References

External links 
Pat Dubar – BandToBand.com
 – official Corporate Avenger website
 – official Sitting Bull website

Year of birth missing (living people)
Living people
American rock singers
Mind Funk members
Place of birth missing (living people)